WFUV (90.7 FM) is a non–commercial radio station licensed to New York, New York. The station is owned by Fordham University, with studios on its Bronx campus and its antenna atop nearby Montefiore Medical Center. WFUV first went on the air in 1947. It became a professional public radio station in 1990 and is one of three NPR member stations in New York City. Its on-air staff has included radio veterans Dennis Elsas, Vin Scelsa, Pete Fornatale, Rita Houston, and current disc jockey Darren DeVivo.

Background 
Founded in 1947 by Fordham University, WFUV became a student-run, 50,000-watt station in 1968-1969 before transitioning to a public station during the late 1980s. WFUV is a National Public Radio affiliate. The station's call letters stand for "Fordham University's Voice." Though operated as a professional public radio station, WFUV's mission also includes a strong training component for Fordham students. Students receive intensive instruction and are heard on the air in news and sports programming. The station is known for its adult album alternative (AAA) format – a mix of adult rock, singer-songwriters, world and other music, formerly branded as "City Folk" – as well as Celtic music.

The station serves 375,000 weekly listeners in the New York area and 100,000 more worldwide on the web each month. As of January 2021, WFUV is the third most popular station in any rock music format in the New York market after WAXQ and WNYL. In terms of weekly audience, it is the most listened to noncommercial alternative music station in the United States. Of all noncommercial stations regardless of format, it is the third most popular in the New York market (after WNYC and WQXR) and 22nd most popular nationally (as of May 2018).

Programming 
Outside of its weekday AAA programming, WFUV airs a variety of specialty shows, which include genres such as folk music and early pop and jazz. National programs heard on WFUV, as of 2021, include World Cafe, The Grateful Dead Hour, and The Thistle and Shamrock. The station has a longstanding Sunday tradition of airing a mix of Celtic music and Fordham University programming during the day and eclectic folk in the evening.

In-studio interviews and performances are also a prominent feature of its programming. On-air guests have included Radio Hall of Famer Arthur Godfrey (in 1947), Pete Hamill, Steve Buscemi, Tim Robbins, Jefferson Airplane, The Association, Graham Nash, Roger McGuinn, The Washington Squares, Suzanne Vega, Jimmy Webb, Peter, Paul & Mary, Cyndi Lauper, Sting, Bo Diddley, Judy Collins, Lou Reed, Brian Wilson, Robert Klein, Kevin Bacon, Dick Cavett, Glen Campbell, Ringo Starr, Joshua Bell, Paul Simon, Art Garfunkel, Robbie Robertson, Los Lobos, Tony Bennett, John Zacherle, The Bad Plus, Buddy Guy, Rosanne Cash, Elvis Costello, Ani DiFranco, The Polyphonic Spree, Jackson Browne, Ben Harper, Richard Barone, The Decemberists, Moby, Uncle Tupelo, Josh Ritter, Neil Young, Of Monsters and Men, Violent Femmes, Mavis Staples, Brian Fallon, and Norah Jones (in her radio debut). WFUV has introduced many other new artists over the years.

On-air staff 
The present day roster of air talent features longtime FUV disc jockey, Darren DeVivo, a station mainstay since 1984; Corny O'Connell, another WFUV vet who joined the staff in the late 1980s; Dennis Elsas, formerly of WNEW-FM; Alisa Ali; and assistant music director Eric Holland. The station's team of DJs also includes Janet Bardini, who recently returned after first working at FUV in the late 1970s into the early 1980s; Benham Jones; production director, Sarah Wardrop; and director of technical operations, George Evans.

Specialty shows are hosted by Kathleen Biggins, who has been a part of WFUV since the mid-1980s ("A Thousand Welcomes"); Don McGee ("Mixed Bag", a program created by Pete Fornatale); Bob Sherman ("Woody's Children," a folk music program that's been heard on New York City radio for over fifty years); Paul Cavalconte, on his second tour of duty at WFUV having started his broadcasting career at FUV in the late 1970s into the late 1980s ("Cavalcade"); John Platt ("Sunday Supper"); digital content editor Kara Manning ("UKNY"); music director Russ Borris ("The Alternate Side"); and Delphine Blue ("The Whole Wide World"). The Irish music program "Ceol na nGael" (translation: "Music of the Irish") continues to be hosted by a team of Fordham students.

History 
WFUV was founded in 1947 by Fordham University's communication department. Early programming was a mix of classical, popular, ethnic music and the University's sports broadcasts. Many chamber music and piano recitals were broadcast live from now-defunct Studio B in the 1950s. The station also broadcast a long-running series of live Sunday classical broadcasts from The Ethical Culture Society in Manhattan.

WFUV was on the verge of going off the air in September 1968, due to budgetary cuts by the university, but the student-staff went on strike and organized rallies and demonstrations to save the station. Around this time, the station became part of the school's Student Affairs division and was run by students. It had been a 3,500-watt station from its inception until February 21, 1969, when its effective radiated power was increased to 50,000 watts. WFUV's daily rock music programming also began in the late 1960s.

WFUV began broadcasting in stereo on March 31, 1973. In the mid 1980s, the station began to transition to a professionally-operated public station "to increase its public service and community impact". WFUV has been a professional noncommercial radio station since 1990. To be more competitive in the New York market at this time, it introduced a more folk and alternative music sound under the name "City Folk", as well as news/talk radio elements such as weather and traffic reports. The station also adopted the nascent adult album alternative format. This shift was overseen by longtime general manager Dr. Ralph Jennings and program director Chuck Singleton.

In May 1994, Fordham started building a  transmission tower for WFUV on its Rose Hill campus, directly across from the New York Botanical Garden (NYBG)'s Enid A. Haupt Conservatory. The NYBG, which did not know about the tower's construction, subsequently requested that construction of the tower be halted. Both the NYBG and Fordham disagreed with the proposed compromise, however. In 1997, the FCC ruled that the tower would negatively affect the NYBG if it were finished, but a New York state court upheld its legality. In 2002, Montefiore Medical Center offered to move WFUV's antenna to its own facilities on Gun Hill Road, one of the highest locations in the Bronx, and Fordham agreed. Fordham subsequently announced in 2004 that it intended to destroy the half-built tower on Rose Hill.

In 2005, the studios, offices, and transmitter moved from the third floor of Keating Hall on Fordham's Rose Hill campus to Keating Hall's basement. The move allowed the station to improve its equipment and gain more space. In 2011, music director Rita Houston took over as the station's program director from Chuck Singleton, who, in turn, became general manager; Houston held the position through 2020. In June 2021, the station named Rich McLaughlin as program director; in addition to his career in radio and streaming music programming, McLaughlin is a Fordham University alumnus who worked for the station as an undergraduate as well as for its digital offering, The Alternate Side.

Notable former staff

Former professional staff 
Notable past-staff at WFUV include DJs Pete Fornatale and Vin Scelsa. Alan Light, former editor-in-chief of music magazines Vibe and Spin and music critic at the New York Times, was an on-air contributor and music critic during the mid-2000s at WFUV. Longtime DJ Rich Conaty presented his big band show The Big Broadcast on the station from 1972-1992, and again from 1998 until his death in 2016. Former program director and DJ Rita Houston, who worked at the station from 1994 until her death in 2020, was a noted New York tastemaker and early champion of artists like Brandi Carlile, Mumford & Sons, Adele, and the Indigo Girls. Binky Griptite, best known as part of Sharon Jones & the Dap-Kings, hosted the weekly show The Boogie Down from 2017 to 2021.

Radio announcer Marty Glickman instructed students in the sports department after his retirement. Glickman was the radio announcer of the New York Knicks, New York Giants, and New York Jets, and the subject of the Martin Scorsese-produced 2013 HBO documentary film Glickman.

Former student staff 

WFUV's rock music shows were formerly hosted by Fordham students, most notably Pete Fornatale, whose first show began in November 1964, when he was a sophomore and who returned to WFUV in 2001 after a 30-year hiatus, remaining until his 2012 death. Other alumni include: 
 Alan Alda, M*A*S*H and The West Wing actor
 Ozzie Alfonso, Emmy Award-winning director and writer of educational shows 3-2-1 Contact and Sesame Street
 Jack Haley Jr., film and television producer
 Bob Keeshan, actor, most notable for his role as Captain Kangaroo
 Ted May, Emmy Award-winning director for Sesame Street
 Charles Osgood, retired host of CBS News Sunday Morning and The Osgood Report on CBS Radio
John Schaefer, noted music journalist and host of WNYC's New Sounds and Soundcheck; former WFUV program director
 Raymond Siller, the head writer for Johnny Carson
News department alumni are/were heard on many stations and networks nationally. These include:
Scott Detrow, co-host of the NPR Politics Podcast and NPR White House Correspondent
Alice Gainer, Emmy Award-winning reporter for CBS in New York City
Richard Hake, longtime WNYC reporter and host of Morning Edition
 Greg Kelly, formerly of Good Day New York and Fox and Friends
 Jonathan Vigliotti, Emmy Award-winning foreign correspondent for CBS News

The sports department has produced numerous notable alumni, most notably, Brooklyn/Los Angeles Dodgers announcer and Baseball Hall of Famer Vin Scully, who helped found WFUV. Other alumni include:
 Mike Breen, television announcer for the New York Knicks and the NBA on ABC, recipient of the 2020 Curt Gowdy Media Award
 Chris Carrino, radio announcer for the Brooklyn Nets and Compass Media
 Jack Curry, studio analyst for YES Network, former sportswriter for The New York Times
 Spero Dedes, television announcer for CBS and Turner, former radio announcer for the Los Angeles Lakers and New York Knicks
 Michael Kay, television announcer for the New York Yankees and host of the radio show The Michael Kay Show and CenterStage
 Malcolm Moran, sportswriter for USA Today and The New York Times, founder of WFUV show One on One, recipient of the 2007 Curt Gowdy Media Award
 Sal Marchiano, retired two-time Emmy Award-winning sports anchor WPIX in New York
 Bob Papa, radio announcer for the New York Giants, announcer for NBC and Golf Channel
 Tony Reali, host of ESPN's Around the Horn and sports contributor to Good Morning America
 Ryan Ruocco, television announcer for the Brooklyn Nets, New York Yankees, NBA on ESPN, and WNBA on ESPN
 Charlie Slowes, radio play-by-play announcer for the Washington Nationals
 Mike Yam, host at Pac-12 Network, former host of ESPN's SportsCenter

Recognition 
WFUV has received numerous awards and nominations from professional organizations on local, state, and national levels. In the early 2000s, the station was named one of the best radio stations in its category on multiple occasions by trade organizations. The Princeton Review named it one of the top twenty college radio stations every year from 2012 to 2020. In 2013, Complex listed it as the eighth best college radio station in the country.

WFUV is regularly distinguished for their newscasts and public affairs coverage. Nationally, the newsroom has been awarded nearly every year over the past two decades by the Public Radio Journalist Association and the Alliance for Women in Media Foundation's Gracie Awards on both professional and student levels. Since 2009, assistant news and public affairs director Robin Shannon has been awarded six times by these two organizations for Best News Anchor/Newscast. Former music and program director Rita Houston was awarded on multiple occasions by trade organizations FMQB, JBE, Gavin Report, and ASCAP for her work.

Selected national professional awards (1998–present)

 2000: ASCAP Deems Taylor Awards – Broadcast Award for WFUV's City Folk, The Big Broadcast and Swing Time (Rita Houston and Rich Conaty)
 2001: Gavin Music Director of the Year – Rita Houston
 2001: Gavin Station of the Year – WFUV
 2001: FMQB Triple A Conference – Progressive Noncommercial Radio Station of the Year
 2002: FMQB Triple A Conference – Progressive Noncommercial Radio Station of the Year
 2003: FMQB Triple A Conference – Progressive Noncommercial Radio Station of the Year
 2003: R&R Triple A Summit Industry Achievement Awards – Music Director of the Year – Rita Houston
 2004: R&R Triple A Summit Industry Achievement Awards – Air Personality Of The Year – Rita Houston
 2004: Lincoln University’s Unity Awards in Media – Outstanding Reporting of Education for "Cityscape: Education Beat"
 2004: National Federation of Community Broadcasters' Golden Reels Awards – Best National Public Affairs Programming for "Democracy on the Block" (Finalist)
 2005: RTDNA's National Edward R. Murrow Awards – Best News Series (Radio Large Market) for Subculture
 2007: ASCAP Deems Taylor Awards – Broadcast Award for WFUV's Idiot’s Delight (Vin Sclesa)
 2011: Society of Professional Journalists' Sigma Delta Chi Awards – Best Radio Feature Reporting for "Ernie Harwell: Our Friend in the Booth"
 2012: FMQB Triple A Conference – Program Director of the Year – Rita Houston
 2019: FMQB Triple A Conference – Program Director of the Year (Noncommercial) – Rita Houston
 2020: JBE Triple A Awards – Program Director of the Year (Noncommercial) – Rita Houston

References 
Notes

External links 
 

Fordham University media
Adult album alternative radio stations in the United States
Radio stations established in 1947
FUV
NPR member stations
FUV
1947 establishments in New York City